Juhamatti Tapio Aaltonen (born 4 June 1985) is a Finnish professional ice hockey winger, who currently plays for Oulun Kärpät of the Finnish Liiga. Known for his skill and skating speed, Aaltonen was drafted by the St. Louis Blues as the 248th selection overall in the 2003 NHL Entry Draft.

Playing career
Aaltonen started his professional career with Oulun Kärpät, playing with the team from 2002 to 2009 winning Finnish championship twice. After the years he spent with Kärpät, Aaltonen moved to Lahti to play for Pelicans, where he played his breakthrough year scoring 28 goals and 49 points in 58 games in regular season. He signed a five-year contract with Pelicans, but the contract also gave Aaltonen a possibility to play in other leagues.

This option in his contract was exercised on 15 June 2010, when he was loaned from the Pelicans to Russian club, Metallurg Magnitogorsk of the KHL. Aaltonen was an integral part of Metallurg's offense in his two seasons in the KHL before he opted to sign with Swedish club, Rögle BK of the then Elitserien on 15 October 2012. He made his debut in Sweden two-days later and in the 2012–13 season, contributed with 31 points in 42 regular season games.

After a season's long return with his original Finnish club, Kärpät, Aaltonen signed for his third Finnish team, and only KHL participant, Jokerit on 1 August 2014. After Jokerit he had a season with Helsinki IFK in Liiga moving to SHL with Rögle BK for the 2017–18 season.

International play
Following the season 2009–10 season, he was selected to join the Finland men's national ice hockey team and he played at the 2010 IIHF World Championship. He won the World Championship in 2011 IIHF World Championship. He also played in the 2014 Winter Olympics, scoring the game-tying goal against Russia in the quarterfinal and went on to win bronze.

Career statistics

Regular season and playoffs

International

References

External links

1985 births
Living people
SC Bern players
Finnish expatriate ice hockey players in Sweden
Finnish expatriate ice hockey players in Russia
Finnish ice hockey right wingers
HIFK (ice hockey) players
Ice hockey players at the 2014 Winter Olympics
Jokerit players
Lahti Pelicans players
Medalists at the 2014 Winter Olympics
Metallurg Magnitogorsk players
Olympic bronze medalists for Finland
Olympic ice hockey players of Finland
Olympic medalists in ice hockey
Oulun Kärpät players
People from Ii
Rögle BK players
St. Louis Blues draft picks
Skellefteå AIK players
Sportspeople from North Ostrobothnia